was a Japanese long jumper who competed in the 1964 Summer Olympics and in the 1968 Summer Olympics.

Yamada was the first Asian to jump eight metres, doing so with a leap 8.01 at Odawara on June 7, 1970.

References

1942 births
1981 deaths
Japanese male long jumpers
Japanese male  sprinters
Olympic male long jumpers
Olympic male  sprinters
Olympic athletes of Japan
Athletes (track and field) at the 1964 Summer Olympics
Athletes (track and field) at the 1968 Summer Olympics
Asian Games gold medalists for Japan
Asian Games silver medalists for Japan
Asian Games gold medalists in athletics (track and field)
Asian Games medalists in athletics (track and field)
Athletes (track and field) at the 1966 Asian Games
Athletes (track and field) at the 1970 Asian Games
Medalists at the 1966 Asian Games
Medalists at the 1970 Asian Games
Japan Championships in Athletics winners